"Pride Is the Devil" (stylized as "p r i d e . i s . t h e . d e v i l") is a song written and performed by American rappers J. Cole and Lil Baby. Produced by T-Minus, it was released on May 14, 2021, as part of the former's sixth studio album, The Off-Season.

Production and composition
The song is produced by T-Minus and samples Aminé's "Can’t Decide" from his 2020 album Limbo, also produced by T-Minus. It is the first collaboration between Cole and Lil Baby, after the two appeared together in 2019 for Dreamville's recording sessions for the compilation album Revenge of the Dreamers III.

Critical reception
Varietys Brandon Yu said Lil Baby's feature was a standout appearance on the song. Carl Lammare of Billboard also mentioned Lil Baby's feature on Drake's "Wants and Needs" and Cole's "Pride Is the Devil" in 2021 saying he "floated on both tracks, most notably the latter, where he solidified his standing as one of rap's premier stars."

Commercial performance
Upon its first week of release, "Pride Is the Devil" debuted at number 7 on the US Billboard Hot 100 along with three other tracks from the album, making Cole the third artist to debut four songs in the top ten.

Awards and nominations

Charts

Weekly charts

Year-end charts

Certifications

References

2021 songs
J. Cole songs
Lil Baby songs
Song recordings produced by T-Minus (record producer)
Songs written by J. Cole
Songs written by Lil Baby